Valencia CF is an association football club based in Valencia, Spain, that plays in La Liga. The club was formed in 1919, and played its first competitive match on 21 May 1919, when it lost 1–0 to Valencia Gimnástico. They were promoted to La Liga for the first time in 1931–32, finishing 7th at the first attempt, and have only spent one season (1986–87) outside the top division since then. They are one of the most successful clubs in Spanish football, having won La Liga on six occasions and the Copa del Rey eight times. They also won the Supercopa de España in 1999 and its predecessor, the Copa Eva Duarte, in 1949. They have also had significant success on the European stage, winning the UEFA Cup, and its predecessor the Inter-Cities Fairs Cup, on three occasions. In addition to this, they have claimed two UEFA Super Cups, the UEFA Cup Winners' Cup in 1980, and the UEFA Intertoto Cup in 1998. They were defeated finalists in the UEFA Champions League in both 2000 and 2001.

Ricardo Arias holds the record for most overall appearances, having played 501 times between 1976 and 1992. Waldo is the all-time top scorer with 160.

The list includes notable footballers who have played for Valencia. Generally, this means players that have played at least 100 league games and/or have reached international status.

Key

Players whose name is in italics currently play for the club.
The years are the first and last calendar years in which the player was registered to the club.
Appearances and goals comprise only those in league matches; that is those in La Liga and the Segunda División.

List of players

Notes

 For a full description of positions see football positions.
Pichichi.Won the Pichichi Trophy while at Valencia.
Zamora.Won the Ricardo Zamora Trophy while at Valencia.
A.  Mundo and Mario Kempes are the only Valencia players to win multiple Pichichi Trophies, doing so twice each.
B.  Waldo holds the record for most Valencia goals, with 160.
C.  Ricardo Arias holds the record for most Valencia appearances, with 501.
D.  Gaizka Mendieta is the most expensive player ever sold by Valencia, costing €48 million when he moved to Lazio in 2001.
E.  Amedeo Carboni holds the record for most Valencia appearances by a foreign player, with 375.
F.  Santiago Cañizares has the most Ricardo Zamora Trophies of any Valencia player, with 3.
G.  Gonçalo Guedes is the most expensive player ever bought by Valencia, costing €40 million when he moved from Paris Saint-Germain in 2018.

References

 
Valencia
Players
Association football player non-biographical articles
Players